Hypergol Maintenance Facility (HMF) is a rocket fuel and engine center located in an isolated location in the Kennedy Space Center industrial area.  It was constructed in 1964 to support the Apollo program and upgraded in 1985 to support the Space Shuttle program.  The facility was used for storage and processing of the hypergolic propellants used in the Space Shuttle's reaction control system, Orbital Maneuvering System, and auxiliary power units which were used to provide hydraulic power to the shuttle's control surfaces, main engines and brakes.  The facility was previously used for cryogenic testing during the Apollo program and Solid Rocket Booster aft skirt hot-testing. 
The facility includes:
 multiple hypergol storage buildings
 a Hazardous Waste Staging Shelter,
 a Hazardous Waste Staging Area (formerly the Liquid Oxygen Fuel Pad)
 a Liquid Hydrogen Fuel Pad (no longer used)
 Temporary Storage and Disposal Facility (used from 1981 to 1998, now used for equipment storage)
 leaching ponds and equipment shelters.

The full name for the facility is Hypergol Maintenance Facility Hazardous Waste South Staging Area.

Contamination
Soil tests in 1998 found surface soil to be contaminated with polychlorinated biphenyls (PCBs), trichlorofluoromethane (TCFM) and aluminum.

References

Buildings and structures in Merritt Island, Florida
Kennedy Space Center
Space Shuttle program